Andrew Gibson (born May 31, 1979) is a Canadian curler from Bedford, Nova Scotia.

Career

Career with Mark Dacey
Gibson was a member of Mark Dacey's rink from 2003 to 2010. He has been to the Brier three times with Dacey (2003, 2004, 2006) winning the Brier in 2004. In 2004 he won a bronze medal at the World Curling Championships. Before playing for Dacey, Gibson played for Peter Eddy and had played in two Canadian Junior Curling Championships. At the 2010 Canadian Mixed Curling Championship, Gibson played second for Dacey and won the event.

Transition to Shawn Adams and return to Mark Dacey
Gibson left Dacey's team in 2010 to play for Shawn Adams. He would return to the Brier in 2011. After the disbanding of the Adams team, Gibson would return to play second for Mark Dacey.

References

External links

1979 births
Brier champions
Canadian mixed curling champions
Curlers from Nova Scotia
Living people
Sportspeople from Dartmouth, Nova Scotia
Sportspeople from Halifax, Nova Scotia
Canadian male curlers
Continental Cup of Curling participants
Canada Cup (curling) participants
People from Bedford, Nova Scotia
21st-century Canadian people